was a Japanese nobleman and waka poet in the Heian period.

External links 
E-text of his poems in Japanese

1016 births
1097 deaths
Minamoto clan
11th-century Japanese poets
Hyakunin Isshu poets